Kali is a 2016 Indian Malayalam-language action thriller film directed and co-produced by Sameer Thahir. It stars Dulquer Salmaan and Sai Pallavi in lead roles. It is the second collaboration of Thahir and Salmaan, after Neelakasham Pachakadal Chuvanna Bhoomi (2013). 

The film was shot in Kochi, Vagamon, Athirappilly, Masinagudi, and Gudalur. 

Kali was released on 26 March 2016 to critical and commercial success. It has since been remade in Kannada as Kidi and in Marathi as Circuitt. The film was dubbed and released into Telugu as Hey Pillagada in November 2017.

Plot 
Siddharth suffers from anger issues,finding it difficult to control himself for petty issues. He is in love with his classmate Anjali. The duo gets married after their graduation against the wishes of their parents. With the help of his friends, Siddharth gets a job at a bank in Kochi. Anjali tells Sidharth that he should control his anger for which anger management schools can be attended. Anjali's parents invite them for Anjali's brother's engagement where Anjali tells her mother to make her father call Siddharth. Sidharth concentrates on his work to bring down his anger and encounters foolish customers, much to his irritation.  

In one such instance, Anjali breaks up with Siddharth mentioning that she cannot lead a life with him. Siddharth offers to take her home at Masinagudi in Tamil Nadu. On the way, a trucker named Chakkara overtakes their car without warning, which almost causes the couple to crash. Furious, Siddharth follows Chakkara and successfully overtakes him, but Anjali begs him to leave the matter. On the way, they stop at a restaurant for dinner, which is headed by a ruthless gangster named John. The couple learns that Chakkara is also one of John's henchmen. Siddharth gets into trouble due to his temper and learns that Chakkara is interested in Anjali. 

Siddharth is about to get into a fight with Chakkara, but Anjali stops him. When both of them realize they don't have cash, the hotel staff suggests one of them to leave and bring the cash from the nearby ATM. Anjali doesn't want to leave alone but leaves for the ATM though she lacks driving skills. After she leaves, Chakkara leaves the restaurant. Fearing the worst, Siddharth tries to contact Anjali, who is also unable to contact Siddharth due to lack of network. She also doesn't find any ATM. She notices Chakkara's truck following her and trying to scare her so that she cannot drive the car in the lonely road. She continues driving, but is unable to escape as it is a one-way road.

Fearing Anjali's safety, Siddharth tries to escape from the restaurant, but is captured by the henchmen and is locked in a room. Anjali keeps on driving where another trucker, who had noticed the couple in the restaurant witnesses the chase. Siddharth tries to escape from the room where a young boy opens the locked room. Siddharth steps into the middle of a gang war. At the same time, Chakkara corners Anjali when her car gets stuck in the mud, but escapes when the other trucker arrives on the scene with police which enables Anjali to escape from Chakkara's cruel intentions. Anjali, along with the police, arrives back at the restaurant to find John injured and Siddharth with a knife. 

Siddharth is arrested, but John reports to the police that the restaurant's previous owner arrived with a gang to kill him. Siddharth and Anjali continue their journey where Siddharth apologizes to Anjali and promises to control his anger, though it can't be done overnight and tells her that he’s sure he can change with her by his side and Anjali agrees. On the way, they encounter Chakkara, whose truck has broken down. Siddharth decides to leave him, but Anjali, who is furious with Chakkara, refuses to forgive him for harassing her. Anjali stops the car as a sign to tell Siddharth that something must be done and so he steps out to vent his anger with Anjali's complete approval and charges towards Chakkara.

Cast 

 Dulquer Salmaan as Siddharth
 Sai Pallavi as Anjali
 Vinayakan as John
 Chemban Vinod Jose as Chakkara
 Soubin Shahir as Prakasan
 V. K. Prakash as Siddharth's father
 Sandhya Ramesh as Siddharth's mother
 Sidhartha Siva as Service Centre Manager
 Sandeep Narayanan as SI Senthil Kumar
 Vanitha Krishnachandran as Anjali's mother
 Dinesh Panicker as Anjali's father
 Kunchan as House Owner
 Alencier Ley Lopez as FD Customer
 Anjali Nair as House owner's daughter
 Master Ihman as House owner's grandson
 Hareesh Perumanna as Hamsa
 Imthiyaz Khader as Bank Manager
 Sini Abraham as Smitha
 Thanseel P. S. as Alex, Sidharth's friend
 Nebish Benson as Young Sidharath
 Vijilesh Karayad as Moped Guy

 Karthik Vishnu as Waiter Boy

Soundtrack 
The music is composed by Gopi Sunder and the soundtrack was released on 11 March 2016 by Satyam Audios.

Adaptations
It has been remade in Kannada as Kidi. The film was dubbed and released into Telugu as Hey Pillagada in November 2017. In 2023, It is also remade in Marathi as Circuitt.

Box office 
IBTimes reported that the film collected  in the opening day from Kerala; breaking the previous record of Loham (2015) to become the highest Malayalam opener. It grossed 5.89 crore after 3 days.

The film is reported to have collected ₹16.4 crore at the Kerala box office.

References

External links 

2016 films
2010s Malayalam-language films
Indian action thriller films
Films set in Tamil Nadu
Films shot in Ooty
Films shot in Kochi
Films shot in Thrissur
Films shot in Chalakudy
Fictional portrayals of the Tamil Nadu Police
Films shot in Tamil Nadu
Malayalam films remade in other languages
Films directed by Sameer Thahir
2016 action thriller films